The S-300 (NATO reporting name SA-10 Grumble) is a series of long-range surface-to-air missile systems developed and operated by the former Soviet Union, now fielded by the militaries of Russia, Ukraine, and other former Eastern Bloc countries. It was produced by NPO Almaz, based on the initial S-300P version. The S-300 system was developed to defend against air raids and cruise missiles for the Soviet Air Defence Forces. Subsequent variations were also developed to be able to intercept ballistic missiles. The S-300 system was first deployed by the Soviet Armed Forces in 1979, designed for the air defence of military bases and large industrial and administrative facilities, as well as control of airspace against enemy strike aircraft. During the Russian invasion of Ukraine in 2022, military analysts have stated that Russia has modified a number of systems to perform surface-to-surface strikes.

The system is fully automated, though manual observation and operation are also possible. Components may be near the central command post, or as distant as 40 km. Each radar provides target designation for the central command post. The command post compares the data received from the targeting radars up to 80 km apart, filtering false targets. The central command post features both active and passive target detection modes.

The project-managing developer of the S-300 is Almaz-Antey. S-300 uses missiles developed by both MKB "Fakel" and NPO Novator design bureaus (separate government corporations, previously named "OKB-2" and "OKB-8").

The S-300 was still in 2006 regarded as one of the most potent anti-aircraft missile systems currently fielded. It is mainly used in Asia and Eastern Europe, including NATO member countries Bulgaria and Greece. An evolved version of the S-300 system is the S-400 (NATO reporting name SA-21 Growler), which entered service on 28 April 2007.

Variations and upgrades
Serial production started in 1975. The tests were completed in 1978 (for the S-300P variant), 1983 (for the S-300V), and 1987 (for the S-300V's anti-ballistic capabilities). Numerous versions have since emerged with different missiles, improved radars, better resistance to countermeasures, longer range, and better capability against short-range ballistic missiles or targets flying at very low altitude. There are currently three main variations.

S-300 system family tree

S-300P

Land-based S-300P (SA-10)

The S-300PT (transliterated from Russian С-300П, NATO reporting name SA-10A Grumble) is the original version of the S-300 system which became operational in 1978. In 1987, over 80 of these sites were active, mainly in the area around Moscow. The P suffix stands for PVO-Strany (country air defence system). The 5P85-1 vehicle is a semi-trailer truck. Usually a 76N6 (CLAM SHELL) low-altitude detection radar is also a part of the unit.

The S-300PT included the use of a passive electronically scanned array radar and had the ability to engage multiple targets on a single fire-control system. Since the original system was semi-mobile, it took over one hour to set it up for firing and the missile hot launch system could scorch the transporter erector launcher (TEL).

It was originally intended to use the track-via-missile (TVM) guidance system. However, the TVM system had problems tracking targets below 500 m. To improve tracking of low-altitude targets, a command-guidance system was added to guide the missile for the initial part of the flight. This allowed the minimum engagement altitude to be set at 25 m.

Improvements to the S-300P resulted in several sub-versions for both domestic and export markets. The S-300PT-1 (SA-10B) and S-300PT-1A (SA-10C) are incremental upgrades of the original S-300PT system using a new 5V55KD missile and the cold launch method thereafter employed. The time to readiness was reduced to 30 minutes and trajectory optimizations allowed the 5V55KD to reach a range of 75 km.

The S-300PS/S-300PM (Russian С-300ПC/С-300ПМ, NATO reporting name SA-10D/E Grumble) was introduced in 1985 and is the only version thought to have been fitted with a nuclear warhead. This model saw the introduction of the modern TEL and mobile radar and command-post vehicles that were all based on the MAZ-7910 8 × 8 truck. The surveillance radar of these systems was designated 30N6. Also introduced with this version was the distinction between self-propelled and towed TELs. The towed TEL is designated 5P85T. Mobile TELs were the 5P85S and 5P85D. The 5P85D was a "slave" TEL, being controlled by a 5P85S "master" TEL. The "master" TEL is identifiable thanks to the large equipment container behind the cabin; in the "slave" TEL this area is not enclosed and is used for cable or spare tyre storage.

The next modernization, called the S-300PMU, (Russian С-300ПМУ, US DoD designation SA-10F Grumble) was introduced in 1992 for the export market and featured the upgraded 5V55U missile which still utilized the intermediate SARH terminal guidance method and smaller warhead of the 5V55R but increased the engagement envelope to give this missile roughly the same range and altitude capabilities as the newer 48N6 missile (max. range 150 km/93 mi). The radars were also upgraded, with the surveillance radar for the S-300PMU being designated 64N6 (BIG BIRD) and the illumination and guidance radar being designated 30N6-1 in the GRAU index.

The total production for the S-300P systems was 3,000 launchers and 28,000 missiles through 2012.

S-300PMU-1/2 (SA-20A/B)

The S-300PMU-1 (US DoD designation SA-20A, NATO reporting name SA-20 Gargoyle) was also introduced in 1993 with the new and larger 48N6 missiles for the first time in a land-based system and introduced all the same performance improvements from the S300PM version including the increased speed, range, TVM guidance and ABM capability. This version also saw the introduction of the new and more capable 30N6E TOMB STONE radar.

The S-300PMU-1 was introduced in 1993 using different missile types in a single system for the first time. In addition to the 5V55R and 48N6E missiles, the S-300PMU-1 can utilise two new missiles, the 9M96E1 and 9M96E2. Both are significantly smaller than the previous missiles at  respectively, and carry a smaller  warhead. They are still carried 4 per TEL. Rather than just relying on aerodynamic fins for manoeuvring, they use a gas-dynamic system which allows them to have an excellent probability of kill (Pk) despite the much smaller warhead. The Pk is estimated at 0.7 against a tactical ballistic missile for either missile. The S-300PMU-1 typically uses the 83M6E command and control system, although it is also compatible with the older Baikal-1E and Senezh-M1E CCS command and control systems. The 83M6E system incorporates the 64N6E (BIG BIRD) surveillance/detection radar. The fire control/illumination and guidance radar used is the 30N6E(1), optionally matched with a 76N6 low altitude detection radar and a 96L6E all altitude detection radar. The 83M6E command and control system can control up to 12 TELs, both the self-propelled 5P85SE vehicle and the 5P85TE towed launchers. Generally support vehicles are also included, such as the 40V6M tow vehicle, intended for lifting of the antenna post.

China developed its own version of the S-300PMU-1, called HQ-15. Previously, the missile was referred to in the Western think tank as the HQ-10, causing confusion with the unrelated HQ-10 short-range point defense missile system.

This system is apparently capable against not just short-range ballistic missiles, but also medium-range ballistic missiles. It uses the 83M6E2 command and control system, consisting of the 54K6E2 command post vehicle and the 64N6E2 surveillance/detection radar. It employs the 30N6E2 fire control/illumination and guidance radar. Like the S-300PMU-1, 12 TELs can be controlled, with any mix of 5P85SE2 self-propelled and 5P85TE2 trailer launchers. Optionally it can make use of the 96L6E all-altitude detection radar and 76N6 low-altitude detection radar.

S-300F

Sea-based S-300F (SA-N-6)

The naval version utilises the TOP SAIL or TOP STEER, TOP PAIR and 3R41 Volna (TOP DOME) radar and utilises command guidance with a terminal SARH mode. It is stored in eight (Slava) or twelve (Kirov) 8-missile rotary launchers below decks. The export version of this system is known as Rif (Russian Риф – reef). The NATO name, found also in colloquial use, is "Grumble".

Sea-based S-300FM (SA-N-20)
The S-300FM Fort-M (Russian С-300ФМ, DoD designation SA-N-20) is another naval version of the system, installed only on the Kirov-class cruiser , and introduced the new 48N6 missile. The new missiles also introduced a track-via-missile guidance method and brought with it the ability to intercept short-range ballistic missiles. This system makes use of the TOMB STONE MOD rather than TOP DOME radar. The export version is called the Rif-M. Two Rif-M systems were purchased by China in 2002 and installed on the Type 051C air-defence guided missile destroyers.

Both naval versions are believed to include a secondary infrared terminal seeker, similar to the newer US Standard missile system, probably to reduce the system's vulnerability to saturation. This also allows the missile to engage contacts over the radar horizon, such as warships or sea-skimming anti-ship missiles.

S-300V (SA-12)
The S-300V, starting with the 9M83 missile, entered service in 1983, while it was fully integrated in 1988.

The 9K81 S-300V Antey-300 (Russian 9К81 С-300В Антей-300 – named after Antaeus, NATO reporting name SA-12 Gladiator/Giant) varies from the other designs in the series. It was built by Antey rather than Almaz, and its 9M82 and 9M83 missiles were designed by NPO Novator. The V suffix stands for Voyska (ground forces). It was designed to form the top tier army air defence system, providing a defence against ballistic missiles, cruise missiles, and aircraft, replacing the 2K11 Krug.

While it was created from the same project, hence sharing the common S-300 designation with the S-300P air defense family, the S-300V focused on different priorities resulting in a different design. The S-300V system is carried on tracked MT-T transporters, which gives it better cross-country mobility than the S-300Ps moving on 8 × 8 wheeled transporters. Its search, tracking, and command systems are more distributed than the S-300P's. For example, while both have mechanically scanning radar for target acquisition (9S15 BILL BOARD A), the battery level 9S32 GRILL PAN has an autonomous search ability and SARH delegated to illumination radar on TELARs. The early 30N6 FLAP LID on the S-300P handles tracking and illumination, but is not equipped with an autonomous search capability (later upgraded). 9S15 can simultaneously carry out active (3 coordinates) and passive (2 positions) search for targets.

The S-300V places a greater emphasis on the anti-ballistic missile (ABM) mission, with a dedicated 9M82 (SA-12B Giant) anti-ballistic missile. This missile is larger and only two can be held on each TELAR. It also has a dedicated ABM radar: the 9S19 HIGH SCREEN phased array radar at battalion level. A typical S-300V battalion is made up out of a target detection and designation unit, a guidance radar, and up to 6 TELARs. The detection and designation unit consists of the 9S457-1 command post, a 9S15MV or 9S15MT BILL BOARD all-round surveillance radar, and a 9S19M2 HIGH SCREEN sector surveillance radar. The S-300V uses the 9S32-1 GRILL PAN multi-channel guidance radar. Four types of missile-launcher vehicles can be used with the system:
Transporter erector and radar (TELAR) vehicles, which not only transport the missiles, but also fire and guide them (includes radar illumination and targeting as well). There are two models: the 9A83-1 TELAR holding four 9M83 Gladiator  missiles and the 9A82 TELAR holding two 9M82 Giant missiles.
Launcher/loader vehicles (LLV), which transport the missiles and can reload the TELARs, and also fire missiles under the control of a TELAR. There are two models: the 9A84 LLV holding two 9M83 Gladiator missiles and the 9A85 LLV holding two 9M82 Giant missiles.

The target detection ranges for each radar vary based on the radar cross-section of the target:
9S15M – 330 km for 10 m2 and 240 km for 3 m2.
9S19M2 – 175 km (unknown cross-section); it contains two passive electronically scanned arrays with a very high resistance to interference.
9S32M (TELAR 9A82/9A83) – range is limited to 200 km, can work independently, or target designation from the S-300V, or a variety of other target designation data systems (AWACS aircraft and various ground-based radar). Targets with a radar cross-section of 0.1 m2 are detected at ranges up to 140 km and are locked on at 120 km. Alogically, 9S32 detection range – MGM-52 Lance 60 km, aircraft missiles 80 km, fighter or ballistic missile MGM-31 Pershing (all of which the U.S. removed from service in 1991) 140 km.
 Size of 0.05 m2 at a distance of 30 km (aiming system in the rocket (10/3 seconds before the missiles hit the target)). In addition, the guidance system inside the rocket supplements for missile guidance systems on commands from the 9A82 / 9A83 and 9S32, and missile guidance systems to passively on the radar illumination and radiation of 9A82 / 9A83.

A S-300V system may be controlled by an upper level command post system 9S52 Polyana-D4 integrating it with the Buk missile system into a brigade.

China has built its own version of the S-300V called HQ-18.

S-300VM (SA-23)

The system is available abroad (1996)

The S-300VM (Antey 2500) is an upgrade to the S-300V. It consists of a new command post vehicle, the 9S457ME and a selection of new radars. These consist of the 9S15M2, 9S15MT2E, and 9S15MV2E all-round surveillance radars, and the 9S19ME sector surveillance radar. The upgraded guidance radar has the Grau index 9S32ME. The system can still employ up to six TELARs, the 9A84ME launchers (up to 4 × 9M83ME missile), and up to 6 launcher/loader vehicles assigned to each launcher (2 × 9M83ME missile each). An upgraded version, dubbed S-300V4, will be delivered to the Russian army in 2011.

The Antey-2500 complex is the export version developed separately from the S-300 family and has been exported to Venezuela for an estimated export price of US$1 billion.
 It became the first system in the world capable of simultaneously engaging cruise missiles, aircraft, and ballistic targets. It also contains a private sector radar for countering areas affected by interference.

S-300V4
The S-300V4 is also called S-300VMD.
It is developed to target high-value airborne targets such as AWACS aircraft at long distances.
Different versions of the NPO Novator 9M82MD S-300V4 missiles have a range of 400 km at Mach 7.5 or a range of 350 km at Mach 9 and can destroy maneuvering targets even at very high altitudes.
An export version exists, marketed as the Antey-4000.

S-400 (SA-21)

The S-400 Triumf (Russian С-400 «Триумф», formerly known as the S-300PMU-3/С-300ПМУ-3, NATO reporting name SA-21 Growler) was introduced in 1999 and featured a new, larger missile and several substantial upgrades and new features. The project encountered delays since its original announcement and deployment only began on a small scale in 2006.

Specifications

The family of S-300 variants will work together in various combinations. Interworking with different variants is limited.  Various higher level mobile command can coordinate into a single battery any quantity, variants, location and so on including integrating other air defence systems.

Variants can engage ballistic missiles as well as aircraft. It is a multi-channel anti-aircraft missile system, able to allocate up to 12 missiles to up to 6 different targets. The system can destroy ground targets at a range of 120 km. When launched on a ballistic trajectory, the range reaches up to 400 km.

A management system consisting of combat control and radar detection allows for fully automatic initiation and effective management of up to one hundred goals located up to 30–40 km from the base station. All tasks – detection, tracking, target setting, target designation, development of target designation, target acquisition, maintenance, capture, tracking and missile guidance, and assessment of results of firing system – are capable of being dealt with automatically.

The operator functions are to control the target detection and implementation of the launch of rockets. In a complex environment, you can manually intervene in the course of combat operation. None of the previous systems possessed these qualities.

Vertical launch missiles allow engagement of flying targets in any direction without traversing the launcher.

Missiles are guided by the 30N6 FLAP LID or naval 3R41 Volna (TOP DOME) radar using command guidance with terminal semi-active radar homing. Later versions use the 30N6 FLAP LID B or TOMB STONE radar to guide the missiles via command guidance/seeker-aided ground guidance (SAGG). SAGG is similar to the U.S.-made Patriot's TVM guidance scheme. The earlier 30N6 FLAP LID A can guide up to four missiles at a time to up to four targets, and can track up to 24 targets at once. The 30N6E FLAP LID B can guide up to two missiles per target to up to six targets simultaneously. Targets flying at up to Mach 2.5 can be successfully engaged or around Mach 8.5 for later models. One missile can be launched every three seconds. The mobile control centre is able to manage up to 12 TELs simultaneously.

All are equipped with a proximity fuse and contact fuse. A warhead will have from 19,000 to 36,000 metal fragments, depending on missile type. Missiles are catapulted clear of the launching tubes before their rocket motor fires, and can accelerate at up to 100 g (1 km/s2). They launch straight upwards and then tip over towards their target, removing the need to aim the missiles before launch. The missiles are steered with a combination of control fins and thrust vectoring vanes. The sections below give exact specifications of the radar and missiles in the different S-300 versions. Since the S-300PM, most vehicles are interchangeable across variations.

Radar
The 30N6 FLAP LID A is mounted on a small trailer. The 64N6 BIG BIRD is mounted on a large trailer along with a generator and typically towed with the now familiar 8-wheeled truck. Usually is used with a mast. Target detection range of 90 km if altitude of the target of 500 meters above the ground (with a mast).

The original S-300P utilises a combination of the 5N66M continuous-wave radar Doppler radar for target acquisition and the 30N6 FLAP LID A I/J-band phased array digitally steered tracking and engagement radar. Both are mounted on trailers. In addition there is a trailer-mounted command centre and up to twelve trailer-mounted erector/launchers with four missiles each. The S-300PS/PM is similar but uses an upgraded 30N6 tracking and engagement radar with the command post integrated and has truck-mounted TELs.

If employed in an anti-ballistic missile or anti-cruise missile role, the 64N6 BIG BIRD E/F-band radar would also be included with the battery. It also employs electronic beam steering and performs a scan once every twelve seconds.

The 36D6 TIN SHIELD radar can also be used to augment the S-300 system to provide earlier target detection than the FLAP LID radar allows.

The S-300 FC Radar Flap Lid can be mounted on a standard pylon.

Missiles

Means of camouflage and protection
 Masking components of S-300 systems are used in full-scale inflatable layouts, equipped with additional devices to simulate electromagnetic radiation in the infrared, optical and radar.

Additional means of masking are used, such as camouflage nets and placement of components of the S-300 in trenches that considerably complicates detection from long range. Station interference with radar enemy, SPN-30, Veil-1.
 Protection. Additional elements of protection are the placement of components of S-300 in the trenches (practiced as placing on the hills for a better view and more rapid care of the horizon, and in the trenches for stealth and protection against fragments of explosions).

Composite element to counter the radar missile program is for S-300 system Paperboy-E, the likelihood of intercepting missiles PIS type of HARM is 0.85 for missiles with active radar-guided, heat or body-managed system pointing the probability of interception of 0.85–0.99. Under the interception perceived inability of the object to cause harm because of his hit miss the target.

Comparison with other systems

Operational history
Russian officials stated that the system has performed well in real-world exercises.
In 1991, 1992, and 1993, various versions of the S-300 destroyed ballistic missiles and other objects in exercises, with a high success rate (90% or more if 1 missile interceptor is used), according to Russian sources.
In 1995, it was the first system in the world to destroy a R-17 Elbrus Scud missile in the air.
China is to test the S-300PMU2 effectiveness in destroying targets in real exercises. The planned targets include a UAV (4.6 km), a simulated strategic bomber (186 km), tactical missiles (range of the system to the point of interception 34 km and a height of 17.7 km), and pinpoint missiles.
In April 2005, NATO held a combat exercise in France and Germany called Trial Hammer 05 to practice Suppression of Enemy Air Defenses missions. Participating countries were pleased that the Slovak Air Force brought an S-300PMU along, providing a unique opportunity for NATO to become familiar with the system.

Israel's purchase of F-35 Lightning II fighters was allegedly intended in part to nullify the threat of S-300 missiles that were, at the time the fighters were initially sought, subject to a potential arms sale to Iran.

In 2010, Russia announced that its military had deployed the S-300 systems in breakaway Abkhazia in 2008, leading to condemnation from the government of Georgia.

Syria

On 17 September 2018, a Syrian S-200 system downed a Russian military plane, killing 15 Russian service members. Moscow accused Israel of indirectly causing this incident, and announced that to keep its troops safe, it would supply Syria with modern S-300 anti-missile rocket systems. Israeli Prime Minister Benjamin Netanyahu objected to the move in a telephone call with Russian president Vladimir Putin, stating that the delivery of S-300 anti-missile rocket systems to "irresponsible players" would be dangerous for the region.

In 2020, Syrian military officials criticized the S-300 air defense systems supplied by Russia, saying they failed to protect Syrian sites from the Israeli strikes. One official criticized the detection abilities of the system's radar.

On 17 May 2022, Israel said that a Russian-operated S-300 missile system is said to have fired a missile at a F-16 operated by the IAF. If confirmed, it would be the first time Russian forces have fired on Israeli jets. According to Channel 13 news, Russia fired 13 missiles at an Israeli F-16, but none of the jets were intercepted by the missile salvos. On 26 July, Israeli Defence Minister Benny Gantz confirmed the initial report of one missile being fired by a Russian operated S-300 system. However, he downplayed the incident as a "one-off", further stating that "Our jets weren’t even in the area". As the missile had not locked on, it was no threat to Israeli jets. It still remains the first use of a S-300 against the Israeli Air Force.

2020 Nagorno-Karabakh conflict

During the 2020 Nagorno-Karabakh conflict, the S-300 system took active part in an armed conflict for the first time, being listed in the active inventory of both sides in different versions. The Armenian systems were initially deployed around Yerevan.
On 29 September 2020, Azerbaijan reported that Armenia was moving its S-300 systems closer to the conflict zone, and vowed their destruction. On 30 September 2020, Azerbaijani Armed Forces claimed the destruction of an Armenian S-300 system without providing further details.
The first alleged combat firing of the S-300 happened during the night between 1 and 2 October when the Armenian Ministry of Defense claimed that Armenian S-300s had downed three Azerbaijani drones (not missiles as initially claimed) bound for Yerevan.

On 17 October 2020, Azerbaijani Armed Forces claimed the destruction of two radar elements part of an active Armenian S-300 SAM site being hit by a Bayraktar TB2 UCAV.

2022 Russian invasion of Ukraine

At the time Russia invaded Ukraine on 24 February 2022, Ukraine had around 100 active S-300 batteries with as many as 300 launchers inherited upon the collapse of the Soviet Union in 1991. By 8 April the Russians had knocked out at least 21 of the S-300 launchers that outside analysts confirmed with photos or videos, with the actual total of destroyed launchers likely higher. Ukrainian President Volodymyr Zelenskyy, in his 16 March message to the U.S. Congress, had consequently asked specifically for help acquiring more of the long-range missiles. "You know what kind of defense systems we need: S-300 and other similar systems", Zelenskyy said.

As the United States and its allies tried to figure out how to deliver S-300s to Ukraine, one plan was for Slovakia to transfer to Ukraine its single battery of S-300s in exchange for the United States or some other country backfilling Slovakia's arsenal with a new air-defense system such as the American-made Patriot. A few days after Zelenskyy asked for S-300s, Germany agreed to deploy some of its Patriots to Slovakia as part of a NATO battlegroup.

On 30 March, Prime Minister Eduard Heger of Slovakia said that he supported sending some of its own S-300s to Ukraine "because this is the equipment that Ukraine needs the most", he told CNN. On 8 April, U.S. President Joe Biden confirmed that Slovakia transferred a Soviet-era S-300 system to Ukraine and said that the U.S. would reposition an American Patriot missile system to Slovakia in return. It appears that it was only one battery that was donated. This was a system that Slovakia inherited from the dissolution of Czechoslovakia in 1993.

On 11 April, the Associated Press reported Russia's claims to have destroyed several air defense systems in Ukraine over the previous two days, indicating a renewed push to gain air superiority and take out weapons Kyiv described as crucial ahead of a broad new offensive in the east. Moscow claimed to have hit four S-300 missile launchers provided by a European country it did not name, but never showed any concrete evidence of that. Slovakia had given Ukraine such a system the previous week, but denied it had been destroyed. Russia previously reported two strikes on similar systems in other places.

Russia's initial invasion was stalled on several fronts by stiff resistance from Ukrainian forces, which prevented the Russians from taking the capital and other cities. Failing to win full control of Ukraine's skies diminished Russia's ability to provide air cover for troops on the ground, limiting their advances while increasing exposure to greater losses. This was effectively proof of the essential value of Ukraine's S-300 defenses in place of the repeatedly requested no-fly zone rejected by NATO early in March as potentially risking escalation into World War III.

In early April, Iran also reportedly returned a large number of S-300 systems for use against Ukraine which it had purchased from Russia in 2007, along with a quantity of its own Iranian-made version, the Bavar-373, which has similar capabilities. Iran Foreign Minister Amir Abdolhainnan refuted allegations of arms transfers to Russia in a call with Ukraine Foreign Minister Dmytro Kuleba.

On 8 July, the governor of the Mykolaiv Oblast, Vitaly Kim, claimed that Russia has been using S-300 missiles in a land attack role by fitting them with GPS guidance and that some 12 missiles were fired this way. On 30 September, The Wall Street Journal reported the claim of Kyrylo Tymoshenko, an adviser to Ukrainian President Volodymyr Zelenskyy, that 16 Russian S-300 missiles configured for ground attack struck near Zaporizhzhia, killing at least 30 civilians and wounding 50 others. Debris from S-300 missiles was found after having struck buildings in Kharkiv on 8 October. Analysts from McKenzie Intelligence Services and the Center for Strategic and International Studies said that these missiles were likely from Russian systems repurposed for ground attack due to the dwindling stock of more precise dedicated anti-surface missiles.

However, some of the reported surface–surface missile strikes by S-300 missiles may actually be instances of Ukrainian S-300s failing to intercept targets, and subsequently falling onto civilian areas on the ground. The most notable case of such unintentional strikes occurred on 15 November 2022, when a stray S-300 missile on a ballistic trajectory fell near the village of Przewodow in Poland, killing 2.

On 22 December, President Putin addressed the Security Council. He made a number of comments, including about the Patriot missiles being sent to Ukraine: "In regards to Patriots, this is quite an old system and it doesn't work as well as our S-300 (missile system)."

Operators and other versions

The S-300 is mainly used in Eastern Europe and Asia, although sources are inconsistent about which countries possess the system.

 – 8 regiments of S-300PMU2
 – S-300PS (SA-10D) 50 systems
 bought two S-300PMU2 (SA-20B) SAM battalions in 2010
 – S-300PS systems delivered from Russia in 2007 to replace older S-300 model in Belarusian inventory. Four divisions of S-300 missiles to be delivered in 2014.
 – 10 S-300 launchers, divided into two units with five launchers each.
 – China first acquired the S-300PMU-1 in 1993, and later became the first customer of S-300PMU-2 in 2004. The total number of the S-300PMU/1/2 and HQ-15/18 batteries in PLA are approximately 40 and 60 respectively, as of 2008. The total number of the missiles is well above 1,600, with about 300 launcher platforms. Five such SAM battalions are deployed and in active duty around Beijing region, six battalions in Taiwan strait region and the rest in major cities like Shanghai, Chengdu and Dalian. Two Rif (SA-N-6) systems were purchased in 2002 for the Chinese Navy for the Type 051C destroyers. By 2011, it had obtained 15 battalions (4 systems) of the S-300PMU-2.
 – The S-300VM "Antey-2500" missile system was ordered in 2014, as part of a multi-billion Egyptian-Russian arms deal signed later that year. The $1 billion contract comprises 4 batteries, a command post and other external elements. In 2015, Russia started delivering the system components, Egyptian soldiers began their training in Russian training centers. By the end of 2017, all batteries were delivered to Egypt. Russia is in talks with Egypt on the delivery of additional Antey-2500 systems.
 – S-300 PMU1 system acquired after the Cyprus Missile Crisis and operated by HAF on Crete consisting of 1 regiment/4 systems/8 fire units/32 launchers / 175 missiles. Greece first fired an S-300 during the White Eagle 2013 military exercise, which was the first time it was used since it had been bought 14 years earlier. Greece is prepared to transfer its S-300 system to Ukraine in exchange for PAC-3 Patriot missile system. If agreed, the PAC-3 system would be based on Crete. The Greek defence minister Nikos Panagiotopoulos has extended this offer to any other Russian equipment that "The same procedure applies to any other Russian-made air defense system that they may want to send to Ukraine."
 – India has procured 6 regiments of S-300, which were later upgraded to S-300VM, which are in use as an 'anti-tactical ballistic missile screen'. However, it isn't clearly announced by Government of India, but some Russian officials and Chinese media have said that India operates the S-300.
 – Originally purchased by Iran in 2007, Russia maintained a self-imposed ban on its sale until the easing of some US sanctions as part of the Iran nuclear deal framework in April 2015 and subsequent Joint Comprehensive Plan of Action. Iran received four S-300PMU2 batteries from Russia in 2016, each consisting of a 96L6E target acquisition radar, a 30N6E2 target engagement radar, and four 5P85TE2 towed transporter-erector-launchers (TELs). The systems are supported by two 64N6E2 battle management radars and linked using FL-95 antenna masts. Iran also operates an unknown number of the domestically produced Bavar 373 systems, which began development during the Russian embargo and entered service in 2019. The S-300s are operated by the Islamic Republic of Iran Air Defense Force. 
 – 10 battalions after the refurbishment (PS – version) (2009 or later), 5 free of charge (2014), and 5 free of charge (2015).
 – North Korea has conducted tests with a system called 'KN-06'.
 – All variations. (1900 (S-300PT/PS/PMU, 200 S-300V/S-300V1 in 2010 year)), 2000 in total launchers. All production in 1994 (actually 1990) or older, all the complexes S-300PM have been repairing and upgrading (Favorit-S). S-300P/PT have been retired before 2008, some S-300PS in service, but were to be retired in 2012–2013. Modernization of all units of the version S-300P to the version S-300PM1 was to end in 2014. Resource of each taken increased by 5 years. PM 1 continued to version PM 2. By 2015 S-300V4 was to have been delivered. Modernization of all S-300V to the version S-300V4 was to end in 2012.
 – An order for 6 systems was signed in 2010. Syrian crews underwent training in Russia and some of the S-300 components were delivered to Syria in 2013. Later, due to the weapons trade embargo against Syria and on request of Israel, the deliveries were halted. After the Russian Su-24 shootdown in November 2015, batteries of the S-300 missile system were officially deployed in the Latakia province for protection of the Russian naval base and warships in Tartus. These are operated by Russian crews. Russia was reconsidering the deliveries of the S-300 to Syria after the missile strikes against Syria in April 2018, but this did not happen. Following the Syrian military's downing of a Russian Il-20 aircraft in Syria in September 2018 using a S-200 system (for which Russia held Israel responsible), Russian defense minister Sergei Shoigu on 24 September said that within two weeks, the Syrian Army will receive S-300 systems. Though the variant was not specified, the stated range of the system is to be 250 km. On 2 October 2018, Shoigu told President Putin during a meeting broadcast that the delivery of the S-300 system to Syria had been completed a day prior. On 8 October 2018, Russian news agency TASS reported that three S-300PM battalions had been given to Syria free of charge, citing "On 1 October three battalion sets of S-300PM systems of eight launchers each were delivered to Syria". According to the source, the deliveries also included more than 100 surface-to-air missiles for each battalion. It is operated by the Syrian Air Defense Force.
 – S-300PT, S-300PS, S-300PMU, S-300V1. Only six systems were kept in working conditions between 2004 and 2014; as a result, only 40% of Ukrainian S-300 systems were in good condition prior to 2014. Due to the war with Russia, Ukraine started repairing and pushing back to service several armaments, including several S-300 batteries, with at least 4 batteries overhauled in the period of 2014–15. 34 launchers remained in Crimea after the 2014 Russian annexation of Crimea. Prior to the 2022 Russian invasion of Ukraine, the country had around 100 batteries. It received an additional battery from Slovakia in April 2022.
 – Ordered 2 battalions of S-300VM "Antey-2500", delivered in May 2012.
 – Bought two S-300PMU-1 systems (12 launchers) for nearly $300 million and RLS 96L6 after 2009. Bought S-300 PMU-2 in 2012.

Former operators
 – One battalion created in 1990. Passed to Slovakia in 1993.
 – One battery S-300PMU and 48 missiles type 5V55R inherited from Czechoslovakia. 3 missiles were fired during exercise in Bulgaria in 2015. The battery was donated to Ukraine in April 2022 in response to the 2022 Russian invasion of Ukraine.
 – Returned to the USSR before re-unification with West Germany.

Evaluation-only operators 
 – S-300P purchased from Belarus (1994). The system was devoid of electronics. S-300V was purchased in Russia officially in the 1990s  (complete set (except for 9S32 GRILL PAN multi-channel guidance radar)).

Cancelled
 – S-300 PMU1 system transferred to Greece after the Cyprus Missile Crisis and operated by HAF on Crete.

Related
Bavar 373

Gallery

See also
List of medium-range and long-range SAMs
HQ-9 
HQ-22
S-350E Vityaz 50R6
S-400 missile system
S-500 missile system

Notes

References

External links

S-300 | CSIS Missile Threat
 S-300 and various other system (in English language) in the Russia (official developer site).
 Australian Air Power: Part 1 and Part 2
 www.dtig.org detailed overview of the S-300P & S-300V family.
Almaz S-300 – China's "Offensive" Air Defence
 Soviet/Russian Missile Designations
 S-300PMU2 Favorit EnemyForces.com
Almaz S-300P/PT/PS/PMU/PMU-1/PMU-2
76N6 Clam Shell Acquisition Radar

Matching of the Patriot (1/2/3) against the S-300 (v/ Antey 2500). In English. Used 8 parameters. Admonition. This test is not officially authenticated but not refuted.
Aviation Week S-300 Surface-To-Air Missile System 

Almaz-Antey products
Anti-ballistic missiles of Russia
Anti-ballistic missiles of the Soviet Union
Cold War surface-to-air missiles of the Soviet Union
Missile defense
Military vehicles introduced in the 1970s
Naval surface-to-air missiles
Self-propelled anti-aircraft weapons of Russia
Self-propelled anti-aircraft weapons of the Soviet Union
Surface-to-air missiles of Russia
Surface-to-air missiles of the Soviet Union